Zahedshahr (formerly, Zahedan (Persian: زاهدان), also Romanized as Zāhedān and Zāhidān) is a city and capital of Shibkaveh District, in Fasa County, Fars Province, Iran.  At the 2006 census, its population was 10,038, in 2,296 families.

References

Populated places in Fasa County

Cities in Fars Province